Touchwood is a former provincial electoral district for the Legislative Assembly of the province of Saskatchewan, Canada. Located south of the Wynyard district in east-central Saskatchewan, it was centred on the Touchwood Hills.

This constituency was created for the 2nd Saskatchewan general election in 1908. It was dissolved and combined with the Last Mountain riding (as Last Mountain-Touchwood) before the 18th Saskatchewan general election in 1975.

Members of the Legislative Assembly

Election results

|-

 
|Provincial Rights
|Joseph Hollis
|align="right"|412
|align="right"|42.13%
|align="right"|–
|- bgcolor="white"
!align="left" colspan=3|Total
!align="right"|978
!align="right"|100.00%
!align="right"|

|-

 
|Conservative
|William Brice
|align="right"|456
|align="right"|29.96%
|align="right"|-12.17
|- bgcolor="white"
!align="left" colspan=3|Total
!align="right"|1,522
!align="right"|100.00%
!align="right"|

|-

 
|Conservative
|John Ernest Johnson
|align="right"|837
|align="right"|27.90%
|align="right"|-2.06
|- bgcolor="white"
!align="left" colspan=3|Total
!align="right"|3,000
!align="right"|100.00%
!align="right"|

|-

|- bgcolor="white"
!align="left" colspan=3|Total
!align="right"|2,964
!align="right"|100.00%
!align="right"|

|-

|- bgcolor="white"
!align="left" colspan=3|Total
!align="right"|3,384
!align="right"|100.00%
!align="right"|

|-

|- bgcolor="white"
!align="left" colspan=3|Total
!align="right"|4,184
!align="right"|100.00%
!align="right"|

|-

|Farmer-Labour
|Edward Hamilton
|align="right"|2,273
|align="right"|28.36%
|align="right"|-12.92
 
|Independent
|William James Burak
|align="right"|1,845
|align="right"|23.02%
|align="right"|–
 
|Conservative
|Caleb Henry Fisher
|align="right"|518
|align="right"|6.46%
|align="right"|-
|- bgcolor="white"
!align="left" colspan=3|Total
!align="right"|8,016
!align="right"|100.00%
!align="right"|

|-
 
|style="width: 130px"|CCF
|Tom Johnston
|align="right"|2,301
|align="right"|34.01%
|align="right"|+5.65

 
|Conservative
|John Hnatyshyn
|align="right"|1,287
|align="right"|19.02%
|align="right"|+12.56

|- bgcolor="white"
!align="left" colspan=3|Total
!align="right"|6,766
!align="right"|100.00%
!align="right"|

|-
 
|style="width: 130px"|CCF
|Tom Johnston
|align="right"|3,337
|align="right"|59.99%
|align="right"|+25.98

 
|Prog. Conservative
|William Seneshen
|align="right"|301
|align="right"|5.41%
|align="right"|-13.61
|- bgcolor="white"
!align="left" colspan=3|Total
!align="right"|5,563
!align="right"|100.00%
!align="right"|

|-
 
|style="width: 130px"|CCF
|Tom Johnston
|align="right"|2,627
|align="right"|42.49%
|align="right"|-17.50

|- bgcolor="white"
!align="left" colspan=3|Total
!align="right"|6,183
!align="right"|100.00%
!align="right"|

|-
 
|style="width: 130px"|CCF
|Tom Johnston
|align="right"|3,614
|align="right"|49.68%
|align="right"|+7.19

|- bgcolor="white"
!align="left" colspan=3|Total
!align="right"|7,274
!align="right"|100.00%
!align="right"|

|-
 
|style="width: 130px"|CCF
|Frank Meakes
|align="right"|2,757
|align="right"|38.17%
|align="right"|-11.51

 
|Prog. Conservative
|James N. Ormiston
|align="right"|217
|align="right"|3.00%
|align="right"|-
|- bgcolor="white"
!align="left" colspan=3|Total
!align="right"|7,222
!align="right"|100.00%
!align="right"|

|-
 
|style="width: 130px"|CCF
|Frank Meakes
|align="right"|2,457
|align="right"|37.18%
|align="right"|-0.99

 
|Prog. Conservative
|Thomas W. Drever
|align="right"|936
|align="right"|14.16%
|align="right"|+11.16
|- bgcolor="white"
!align="left" colspan=3|Total
!align="right"|6,609
!align="right"|100.00%
!align="right"|

|-

 
|NDP
|Frank Meakes
|align="right"|2,566
|align="right"|39.01%
|align="right"|+1.83
 
|Prog. Conservative
|Alice M.L. Turner
|align="right"|1,320
|align="right"|20.07%
|align="right"|+5.91
|- bgcolor="white"
!align="left" colspan=3|Total
!align="right"|6,578
!align="right"|100.00%
!align="right"|

|-
 
|style="width: 130px"|NDP
|Frank Meakes
|align="right"|3,002
|align="right"|52.53%
|align="right"|+13.52

|- bgcolor="white"
!align="left" colspan=3|Total
!align="right"|5,715
!align="right"|100.00%
!align="right"|

|-
 
|style="width: 130px"|NDP
|Frank Meakes
|align="right"|4,450
|align="right"|55.99%
|align="right"|+3.46

 
|Prog. Conservative
|Arnold B. Tusa
|align="right"|893
|align="right"|11.23%
|align="right"|-
|- bgcolor="white"
!align="left" colspan=3|Total
!align="right"|7,948
!align="right"|100.00%
!align="right"|

See also 
Electoral district (Canada)
List of Saskatchewan provincial electoral districts
List of Saskatchewan general elections
List of political parties in Saskatchewan
Touchwood Hills
R.M. of Touchwood No. 248
Raymore, Saskatchewan
R.M. of Mount Hope No. 279

References 
 Saskatchewan Archives Board – Saskatchewan Election Results By Electoral Division

Former provincial electoral districts of Saskatchewan
Mount Hope No. 279, Saskatchewan